MTV Germany is a German language free-to-air television channel operated by Paramount Global. The channel launched on 7 March 1997 as MTV Central, as part of a regionalisation strategy by Paramount Global, then MTV Networks Europe.

Availability 

The channel primarily serves Germany, Austria and Switzerland, however it is widely available across Europe free-to-air.

Between 2011 and 2017, the channel moved behind a paywall, limiting its availability mainly to German-speaking territories. On 24 November 2017 a free-to-air standard definition feed was added to Astra 19.2°E with German and English audio tracks.

It is available in Germany through Sky Germany, UnityMedia, PŸUR, Astra, Deutsche Telekom and Vodafone. In Switzerland, Sky and Astra. In Austria, through A1, Sky, Astra and Magenta.

History

1997–2001 
Since 1993, Germany was served by VIVA as a 24-hour German music channel, while MTV was only broadcast in English through MTV Europe. In 1997, as part of MTV Networks Europe's regionalization strategy, MTV launched a German-speaking channel to target existing competition within the German-speaking markets. MTV Germany launched with specialized German-speaking versions of hit MTV Europe shows which included the Euro Top 20, MTV Select, MTV News, Non-Stop Hits, US Top 20 Hitlist UK, Hitlist Germany, Fashion Zone, MTV Urban and The Lick.

In 1999, MTV Germany became available free-to-air throughout Europe on Astra satellite. In 2001, MTV Networks Germany launched MTV2 Pop, a 24-hour pop music channel (later replaced by Nickelodeon).

2002–2010 
In 2002, MTV Germany began to air programming from MTV US. Most of this programming was either subtitled or dubbed. From 2002 onwards, similar to other MTV channels in Europe, MTV Germany began to drop some of its localized programming in favour of MTV US shows. These shows included Jackass, Date My Mom, Pimp My Ride and Dismissed.

In 2005, MTV owner Viacom purchased its biggest German competitor VIVA.

In early 2006, MTV began to further regionalize its German-speaking feed to include a separate version for Austria and Switzerland. Late in 2009, MTV Networks Germany helped to localize these channels even further with the development of MTV Austria and MTV Switzerland.

From 2008, MTV Germany was also streamed on P2P TV network TVU Player, but was taken off air in March 2009. As of 2009, MTV Germany used the same on-air identity as other MTV channels in Europe. The channel also featured fewer music videos and aired more American MTV shows than German-speaking programming. Most of this programming was subtitled in German. The headquarters for MTV Networks Germany is Berlin. MTV Germany remains one of the only remaining MTV transmitted by analogue satellite in Europe, and among the few transmitted on free-to-air digital services throughout the continent, along with MTV Austria, MTV Italia, MTV Adria and MTV Türkiye.

2011-2021 
From 1 January 2011, MTV Germany was only available on major German pay TV platforms including Sky, Unitymedia, Telekom, and Kabel BW. With the move from a free-to-air to a subscription based service, MTV Germany no longer hosted advertising on its subscription service channel. MTV Germany continued to commission new music programming which included MTV Brand New, MTV Top 11, 3 From 1, The Breakfast Club, Fantastic Music Videos, MTV's Chart Shows (titles to be confirmed), and M is for Music. Localised programming will continue with MTV Home, a German language music and entertainment show. Similar to MTV channels worldwide, MTV Germany aired reality shows including the American version of Skins and new seasons of Jersey Shore, Punk'd with Justin Bieber, When I Was 17, and the Lauren Conrad Fashion Show.

MTV Germany's sister channel VIVA became the main music station for MTV Networks Germany and continued to be available free-to-air across Germany, Austria and Europe.

MTV Networks Germany also launched a new music channel called MTV Brand: New which focused on the new music releases from German-speaking and international artists.

On 16 May 2011 MTV Networks in Germany launched high-definition versions of MTV, VIVA and Nickelodeon. MTV HD, VIVA HD and Nickelodeon/Comedy Central HD are a simulcast of the original MTV channels already available in Germany.

On 1 July 2011 MTV Networks Germany rebranded its MTV channel to embrace the new global on-air identity, sharing the same MTV logo from the US.

In 2013 MTV rebranded to new global on-air identity, sharing the same graphics as MTV's global channels.

In 2014 in September started in HD + deutschland as free to view HD channel.

In 2015 MTV rebranded again to new global on-air identity, sharing the same on-air identity as MTV's global channels.

In 2017 MTV started online free live stream on mtv.de since 20th anniversary of MTV in Germany.

In November 2017 MTV rebranded again to current on-air identity, similar to MTV's global channels.

In 4 December at 13 pm started FTA stream of MTV on Astra 19.2E 11973 3/4 27500 V in SD version.

The same day MTV brought back more music to MTV including new shows as M us for Music, MTV Most wanted, MTV Classics, MTV Rockzone, MTV Urban, MTV Likes, MTV Crush and VIVA Top 100 premiere was moved to MTV and renamed to TOP 100.

In April 2018 music content was prolonged for 2 hours in Monday-Friday as M is for Music until 14 pm (previously until 13 pm) and then MTV Most wanted and in the evening hours there is repeat of 3 From 1 between 6:20 pm and 7:20 pm before MTV Most wanted premiere and 1 hour at weekend prolonging MTV Rockzone and MTV Urban as 2 hour shows.

In May 2018 music content was prolonged for 1 hour at weekends as making the MTV Likes 2 hours show between 1 pm and 3 pm (previously 2 pm, evening repeat of MTV Likes is only half time as previously 7:20-8:15 pm) and There was added MTV Most wanted German chart after end of MTV Most wanted Ultimate charts on Sunday between 2 pm and 3 pm.

In May 2018 was also renamed TOP 100 to MTV Top 100 and start of premiere on MTV was moved from 11 pm to 10 pm on Saturday.

From 29 October 2018, the music will be given more airtime. During the week, a music program can be seen from about 01:30 to 21:15 - more than 80% of daily airtime.

As of 1 November 2018, a timeshift version of MTV Germany will be available on the Nicknight Germany slot under the name  MTV +, which will be shown between 8:15 pm and 5:00 am. MTV + shows the regular MTV program delayed by one hour.

On 31 December 2018, MTV's former rival VIVA was discontinued, thus making MTV the only remaining mainstream music television channel in Germany.

On 1 March 2021, MTV+ was replaced by Comedy Central +1.

2021 onwards
In September 2021 there was a new MTV logo.

In January 2022 was a comeback shows includes 3 From 1 and new music shows includes MTV Yearbook and MTV's Hot 10.
3 from 1 airs from 7 pm to 7:15 pm daily (previously Monday to Friday between 3 pm and 3:15 pm).

In March 2022, after MTV Early Bird Breakfast Club, MTV Hits and MTV Back for good were discontinued, could a new look from MTV, new and comeback shows was aired including MTV In The Mix, MTV Collection, Guess The Year, Deutschstunde (previously at VIVA Germany), 3 From 1, MTV's Hot 10, RockZone, Headbangers Ball Music, Party Zone, Dancefloor, Chill Out Zone, MTV Yearbook and Then & Now, MTV Breakfast Club was rebranded to Breakfast Club. On Summer 2022 was temporarily rebranded MTV's Hot 10 to This week's Hot 10 aired Saturday and Sunday, and Monday to Friday it was replaced with Sound of summer. MTV In The Mix can be seen daily between 8 am and 9 am and Monday to Friday between 11 am and 12:45 pm in TV. New music shows come in TV program soon. MTV In The Mix lasted to 10:00 am Monday with exception on October 3, 2022, with the greatest German-speaking hits like Deutschstunde. Sound Of Summer, of the summer music program, was replaced by Road To EMA, with Best German Act Winners.

Road To EMA aired the last time for the countdown of this year's EMAs, was replaced by the show at November 14, 2022 EMA Afterparty and then the Christmas music show at November 21, 2022 MTV Xmas.
Two MTV Approved music programs Hip Hop and Alternative replaces by Yo! MTV Raps
and Alternative Nation. Since 2023 at second January the channel ID and commercial break IDs are from it looks like MTV Europe.

MTV Christmas was discontinued and replaced by Best of 2022 with a genre Rock. At 9th of January 2023 is Best of 2022 replaced by MTV special with 90s week. MTV special airs weekdays at 9:15 am and 7:15 pm after 3 From 1 ends with different topics from weekend special including top 10, number one hits, decades, sports and much more.

Jahres Charts from MTV in Germany is an chart show because it plays top 100 in the world and in Germany every year. And since New Year's Eve 2022 presents MTV temporary with New Year's Eve Party and Katermusik. At January 7 2023, Guess The Year is at 11:30 pm one more time with the boy band Oasis, after he was coming back.
Guess The Year was at 30th of January in 2023 after 3 From 1 in the morning and evening program at 9:15 am and 7:15 pm for 45 minutes for one week with GUESS THE YEAR WEEKEND and MTV Collection aired with Metallica. 

In April 2023, 3 From 1 is daily at 08:00 am and MTV In The Mix Mondays to Fridays at 8:15 am and 1:15 pm after 3 From 1, this time changes from Party Zone, MTV Yearbook, Guess the Year, MTV Uncensored, Chill Out Zone and other MTV shows are revealed, the decade shows like the channels MTV 80s, MTV 90s and MTV 00s, two new music shows and clip series callthematic at night MTV All Nighter and most voting Star Trax. MTV In The Mix is not at the weekend in April of this year 2023.

Shows
Local
3 From 1 - Music show plays top three music videos on a specific artist or a topic. ( since January 2022 )
Alternative Nation - Alternative music videos
Best of 2022 - The show with this year's music videos to eight January on a genre or topic. (since December 2022 to January 2023)
MTV Collection - A list of music videos of every topics ( since March 7, 2022 )
MTV In The Mix - The greatest hits ( since March 7, 2022 )
MTV Yearbook - The greatest hits of the year ( since January 2022 )
Road To EMA - The countdown of this years EMAs (cancelled November 2022)
Guess the Year - The music show previously on VH1 with music videos by guessing the year ( since March 7, 2022)
Chill Out Zone - weekend night with chill out music ( since March 2022 )
EMA Afterparty - Music videos that it won (From 14 November to 18 November 2022)
MTV Xmas - songs that wishing you a Merry Christmas (until December 2022)
Party Zone - The best dance tracks of techno and house ( since March 2022 )
MTV's Hot 10 - The daily 10 hottest music videos( cancelled May 2022 )
Sound Of Summer - The best summer music on specific topic ( cancelled late September 2022 )
This Week's Hot 10 - The weekly 10 hottest music videos ( since June 2022 )
MTV Weekend Special - weekend and afternoon noon and evening ( since March 2022 )
Then & Now - artists from then and now ( since March 7, 2022 )
Deutschstunde - German-speaking music by Die Toten Hosen, Cro and more. (previously on VIVA) ( since March 12, 2022 )
RockZone - The Greatest Rock Music German and international( since March 13, 2022 )
Dancefloor - The Party and dance Music an Saturday Night ( since March 12, 2022 )
Headbangers Ball - The Greatest Rock Music an Monday Night ( since March 14, 2022 )
MTV Buzz (short block through the commercial ads)
Breakfast Club - The Daily morning Show with Music Videos ( since March 2022 replacing MTV Breakfast Club )
MTV Back for good - songs from the 90s and 00s ( canceled March 2022 )
 M is for Music - The greatest hits replaced by MTV Poland (since 2019 from MTV and nicknight cancelled)
 MTV Hits - The greatest hits replaced by MTV in the mix ( canceled March 2022 )
 MTV Approved (Upcoming and RnB) (since 2019)
 MTV Most Wanted - Album charts (since December 2017)
 MTV Most Wanted - Single Charts (since December 2017)
 MTV Most Wanted - US Charts (since December 2017)
 MTV Most Wanted - Streaming Charts (since October 2018 replacing Ultimate charts)
 MTV Most Wanted - Radio Charts (since March 2020 replacing German charts and German music charts)
 MTV Uncensored (since December 2017)
 MTV Classics (since February 2019 cancelled)
 MTV Urban (since March 2020 cancelled)
 MTV Likes (since April 2020 cancelled)
 MTV Crush (since September 2018 cancelled)
 MTV Yearbook
 #TweetClips (since 2019 cancelled)
 Night Videos
 Fantastic Music Videos (until December 2017)
 MTV After Hours (cancelled)
 Yo! MTV Raps (also known as Yo! MTV Raps: Playlist since 2023 that plays hip hop music)
 Yo! MTV Raps Weekly Wibes
 MTV Push Local (German version)
 Germany Shore

Pan-International

 Isle of MTV
 MTV Push (German-speaking version)
 MTV World Stage
 Queen of the Universe

US

 Are You the One?
 Catfish: The TV Show
 The Challenge
 Deliciousness
 Double Shot at Love with DJ Pauly D and Vinny
 Ex on the Beach US
 Families of the Mafia
 Floribama Shore
 Messyness
 Fresh Out Live
 Jersey Shore: Family Vacation
 Ridiculousness
 SpongeBob Schwammkopf
 Teen Mom
 True Life Crime

UK

 Ex on the Beach
 Geordie Shore
 Just Tattoo of Us
 Teen Mom UK
 True Life Crime UK

Former Local Shows
 Game One
 MTV Crush
 MTV After hours
 MTV Rockzone
 MTV Urban
 MTV Early Bird Breakfast Club
 MTV Classics
 MTV Most Wanted - Ultimate Charts
 MTV Hot
 MTV Hits
 MTV Breakfast Club
 MTV's Hot 10
 Fashion Zone
 MTV Fett
 Brand:Neu
 MTV Home
 MTV Kitchen
 Non-Stop Hits
 Mad 4 Hits
 Alternative Nation
 Partyzone
 Euro Top 20
 Hitlist UK
 Hitlist Germany
 Dance Floor Chart
 US top 20
 MTV In-Touch
 MTV Webchart
 MTV News
 MTV News Highlights
 MTV News Weekend Edition
 MTV News Mag
 MTV Easy
 MTV Bytesize
 MTV Masters
 MTV Sushi
 MTV Top 100 (previously as VIVA Top 100 on VIVA) (until April 2018 as TOP 100 and until October 2019 as MTV Top 100) (cancelled December 2019)
 MTV TRL Germany
 Yo! MTV Raps
 MTV Amour
 MTV Live aus Berlin
 MTV Live
 MTV Megamix
 MTV Comixed
 Saturday Night Music
 Celebrity Deathmatch (German Version)
 Superock
 Sound Of Summer

Former US Shows (Selection)

 16 and Pregnant
 American Dad!
 Celebrity Deathmatch
 Drawn Together
 Family Guy
 Flavor of Love
 Free for All
 Happy Tree Friends
 I Love New York
 Jackass
 Next
 Pimp My Ride
 Room Raiders
 Scarred
 South Park
 Strange Love
 The Osbournes

VJS

Previous VJs

Palina Rojinski (2009 – 2011 / 2019) Yo! MTV Raps
MC Bogy (2019) Yo! MTV Raps
Aminata Belli (2019) MTV Top 100, Yo! MTV Raps Weekly Vibes
Alex Barbian (2019) Yo! MTV Raps Weekly Vibes
 Uli Brase (2017) - MTV Buzz, MTV Top 100 
Jan Köppen (2017 – 2019) MTV Top 100

On-air design
On 7 September 2008 MTV Germany changed their old Wishful Object on-air design to a new MTV: All Eyes On... design, which is also MTV Germany's new slogan. The on-air design was changed once more in July 2009 as a result of re-branding of all MTV channels (excluding MTV US).

MTV Germany also has an advertising agency named Dydree, although it also works for other companies like ARD and Disney.

All Eyes On...
All Eyes On... is one of MTV Germany's ways of highlighting singers and bands that have released new music (and also might not already be widely known). Changing bi-weekly, an artist or group is chosen and then featured in clips announcing commercial breaks. The first band name to be put under the "All Eyes On" badge was MIA.; on 6 October, the first non-German artist was Alicia Keys.

See also
 MTV Adria
 MTV Austria
 MTV Switzerland

References

MTV channels
German-language television stations
Television channels and stations established in 1997
Television stations in Berlin
Music organisations based in Germany